This is a list of Greenland national football team results from 1980 to present.

Results

1980s

1990s

2000s

2010s

2020s

Head-to-head record

References

External links
 
Greenland at RSSSF

Results
Lists of national association football team unofficial results